Eduardo Jiménez (born 3 July 1947) is a Spanish sports shooter. He competed in the men's 25 metre rapid fire pistol event at the 1984 Summer Olympics.

References

1947 births
Living people
Spanish male sport shooters
Olympic shooters of Spain
Shooters at the 1984 Summer Olympics
Place of birth missing (living people)
20th-century Spanish people